Dezső Szomory (born Moshe Weisz; 2 June 1869 – 30 November 1944) was a Hungarian Jewish writer and dramatist. In his history plays and other works, he developed a unique tone and style of Budapest Hungarian; his work has been compared to that of Marcel Proust. He died during the Holocaust while living under Swedish protection in Budapest, suffering "starvation, loneliness, and depression".

References

Bibliography

1869 births
1944 deaths
19th-century Hungarian male writers
Hungarian Jews who died in the Holocaust
Hungarian male dramatists and playwrights
19th-century Hungarian dramatists and playwrights
20th-century Hungarian dramatists and playwrights
20th-century Hungarian male writers
Theatre people from Budapest
Deaths by starvation